Jermaine Demetrius Burton (born June 28, 2001) is an American football wide receiver for the Alabama Crimson Tide. He previously played for the Georgia Bulldogs.

High school career 
Burton attended Calabasas High School in Calabasas, California. Burton was selected to play in the 2020 Under Armour All-America Game. A four-star recruit, Burton committed to play college football at the University of Georgia.

College career

Georgia 
As a true freshman at Georgia in 2020, Burton played in 10 games having three touchdowns and 404 yards on 27 receptions. Burton recorded a career high two touchdowns and 197 yards in a 31–24 victory over Mississippi State. As a sophomore in 2021, Burton played in 12 games tallying five touchdowns, 497 yards, and 26 receptions.

Alabama 
In January 2022, Burton announced he would be transferring to the University of Alabama to play for the Alabama Crimson Tide.  At the conclusion of the 2022 game against Tennessee, Burton struck a female Tennessee fan in the head.

References

External links 
 Alabama Crimson Tide bio
 Georgia Bulldogs bio

Georgia Bulldogs football players
People from Calabasas, California
Players of American football from California
Sportspeople from Los Angeles County, California
American football wide receivers
Alabama Crimson Tide football players
Living people
2001 births